Struindol is a village in Vidin Province in northwest Bulgaria. It is located in the municipality of Belogradchik.

Population
As of 2011, the village of Struindol has 27 inhabitants, down from its peak of 387 people in 1934. Its population is nearly evenly split among ethnic Bulgarians (52%) and ethnic Romani people (48%). Most inhabitants identify themselves as Christians, belonging to the Bulgarian Orthodox Church.

References

Belogradchik Municipality
Villages in Vidin Province